is a 1956 Japanese thriller film directed by Toshio Shimura and starring Michiko Maeda. This film was one of the earliest Japanese films featuring nudity.

Plot
Yoshio Kizaki is framed for murder and theft by his corrupt boss Kenji Asamura. When Natsuki Kagawa, Kizaki's lover who works for the same boss, discovers the plot on a sea voyage, Asamura throws her overboard. Natsuki is washed up on an island where she is rescued by a group of shipwrecked sailors. Fending off the lecherous sailors, she dives for pearls in the surrounding waters and eventually amasses a fortune which she uses to free her lover from prison.

The plot strongly resembles that of the last film of Josef von Sternberg, the 1953 Saga of Anatahan, which told the reputedly true story of stranded Japanese seamen on an island who murder each other for the favors of the only woman.

Cast
Michiko Maeda as Natsuki Kagawa/Pearl Queen
Ken Utsui as Yoshio Kizaki
Shigeru Amachi as Yuzo Yamauchi
Saburō Sawai as Ryōhei Ishizuka
Susumu Fujita as Kenji Asamura

Production
Revenge Of The Pearl Queen was the first of five low budget films produced by the Shintōhō studio featuring Japanese diving girls (ama) although this film had no actual ama in the plot. The following year, Shintōhō released their first genuine ama film, The Girl Diver Trembles in Fear, also directed by Toshio Shimura and starring Michiko Maeda.

References

External links
 
 
 

1956 films
1950s Japanese films
Japanese thriller films
1950s thriller films